Ankyloceras is a genus of Early Devonian cephalopods included in the oncocerid family Karoceratidae. The type species, Ankyloceras nesnayamiense named by Zhuravleva, 1974, comes from Nova Zemlya in Russia. Other species have been found in Japan, Morocco, and Russia.

Morphology
The shell of Ankyloceras is cyrtoconic, exogastrically curved with a compressed to slightly depressed elliptical cross section more narrowly rounded ventrally than dorsally. Sutures form broad lateral lobes. The Siphuncle is marginal to the convex (ventral) side of shell. Septal necks in the type species are loxochoanitic, (inwardly slanting to the siphuncle) on marginal side, short recumbent on  side facing interior. Connecting rings are expanded ventrally at the adapical end of each segment and dorsally at the adoral end.

Similar and related genera
Ankyloceras  is similar in overall form to the earlier Osbornoceras from North America, except for the details of the siphuncle. Similar too are the oncoceratid Diagenoceras and Dunleithoceras, among others, from the latter part of the Ordovician.

References
 Bjorn Kroger, 2008. Nautiloides before and during the Origin of Ammonoids in a Siruro-Devonian Section of the Tafo;at. Amto-atlas, Morocco.  Special Paper in Palaeontology No. 79.  The  Palaeontological Association, London. 
 Ankyloceas, Paleobiology db
 Sepkoski, J.J. Jr. 2002. A compendium of fossil marine animal genera. D.J. Jablonski & M.L. Foote (eds.). Bulletins of American Paleontology 363: 1–560. Sepkoski's Online Genus Database (Cephalopoda)

 See also List of prehistoric nautiloid genera

Prehistoric nautiloid genera